Eltham College is an independent, non-denominational, co-educational day school situated in Research, an outer suburb north east of Melbourne.

Founded in 1973, the school has a non-selective admissions policy and currently caters for approximately 1,200 students from Kindergarten to Year 12.

Although no longer a part, having become an affiliate of the EISM (Eastern Independent Schools of Melbourne), Eltham College is a founding member of the ACS (Association of Co-educational Schools). The College is also affiliated with the Association of Independent Schools of Victoria (AISV).

The school is also associated with EC Waves swimming club and training most training is held at the Eltham College pool.

History

 1973: Desmond D. Davey appointed as first principal. Construction of the College begins with the Principal's residence and Preparatory School
 1974: Classes commence with an enrolment of 135 students. The College's facilities now consist of an Early Learning Centre (kindergarten), Junior Primary Building, craft workshop, and two aboveground swimming pools
 1975: Enrolments increase to a total of 399 students to Year 9. Administration and Junior Secondary buildings are constructed, along with a music suite
 1976: 590 students up to Year 10. First part of the Middle School constructed, along with another craft workshop, and the completion of the ECCA Centre sports stadium. Tennis and basketball courts are established, along with a hockey pitch and oval
 1977: 764 students to Year 11. Second part of the Middle School and Music Centre opened.
 1978: 893 students to Year 12. The Senior School is established, along with extensions to the Music Centre
 1979: 960 students. The second part of the Senior School is established, along with science laboratories
 1980: 1050 students. 43 acres of land opposite the College are purchased for later use
 1983: School Photo, a book commemorating the College's first ten years is produced. The College is now a complex of 16 buildings, complemented by a cohort of 1050 and a staff of 85. The founding Principal, Desmond D. Davey, retires. The new D. D. Davey Library and Auditorium are named in his honour
 1984: Brian Webber is appointed Principal. The College's leadership program is established
1986: A number of Year 5 students under guidance from former Eltham College arts teacher Jan Sardi, performed his rendition of Snow White (Snow White and the Dreadful Dwarves) for ABC's Kaboodle.
 1987: The College's Performance Centre is opened, along with the Preparatory School Library and the L. E. Clarke Visual Arts Building. Middle School science laboratories are established, along with another playing field. John Brennan replaces Brian Webber as Principal
 1992: Stage one of oval, and environmental reserve commences, built on the 43 acres of land purchased by the College in 1980
 1993: The College celebrates its 20th Anniversary. Stage two of the oval and environmental reserve development is completed, thus providing students with new facilities. New uniforms are introduced
 1996: The Year 9 City Campus (located in Flinders Lane) officially opens. The College's quadrangle, known as the Forum, is officially opened, with a Halpern sculpture, to which students contributed, being unveiled
 1998: A new preparatory centre opens in the former Principal's residence (made available by the construction of a new residence the previous year). Further construction work on the Senior School commences, opening the following year
 1999: John Brennan retires as principal
 2000: David Warner is appointed as principal
 2001: The College's name is officially changed to ELTHAM College of Education
 2002: Construction begins on the College's hospitality facilities. The Knowledge Network, a revolutionary intranet service, is unveiled, along with the History Centre for Years 3 and 4
 2003: The College celebrates its 30th Anniversary, along with officially opening the new hospitality centre, now known as Swipers Gully
 2004: Construction commences on the Arthur W. Kirkright sports pavilion
 2005: The College now consists of 1171 students, along with 186 members of staff. Students of the College successfully raise $10,000 to build a library in Laos
 2006: The Arthur W. Kirkright sports pavilion officially opens
 2007: The College announces plans for the Melbourne City School
 2013: The Year 9 City Campus moves to its current location on Lonsdale Street. David Warner retires as Principal
 2014: The College celebrates its 40th Anniversary. Simon Le Plastrier is appointed as the fifth Principal of the College

Principals

Campuses
The College currently comprises two campuses:
 Research Campus Kindergarten to Year 4 (Junior School), Years 5 to 8 (Middle School) and Years 10 to 12 (Senior School), day.
 Year 9 Campus Year 9, day.

The College’s main campus, located in Research, focuses on Kindergarten to Year 12, with only a small portion of Year 9 completed there. The Research campus houses the College's sporting facilities, environmental reserve and restaurant, known as Swiper's Gully.

The College's Year 9 campus is located in Lonsdale Street, Melbourne, and caters solely for Year 9 students and their preparation for life in the city should their career path be based there. Students spend four of the five school days at the city campus, with the fifth day attended at the Research campus.

Swiper's Gully restaurant
Eltham College is known for being one of the few schools with its own restaurant across the road, better known as "Swiper's Gully". This restaurant is predominantly student run, functioning during most days as a café, and most nights as a restaurant. Employees can either work in the kitchen, making the meals (back of house), or can serve the meals (front of house) as part of their VET in the VCE qualification for hospitality.  The menu changes termly and features an entreé, main and dessert, with a variety of wines produced on site and produce also available.

Curriculum

Music
Music at ELTHAM College has become a rather large part of the curriculum. Classes based around music are organised in the kindergarten year. Throughout the junior years students are taught to play recorders as well as song and dance. In the latter years of the junior program students are taught about music technology.

From years 7 and 8 students learn about instrument construction, the role of music in films, percussion performance, an introduction to song writing, the history of pop and rock music and computer music composition. In Year 9 music becomes a partial elective (students must choose two of music, art and ceramics) and from Year 10 onwards music becomes a complete elective.

The VCE music course is based around being able to create a solo performance as part of the assessment. Music also offers two certificates separate to the VCE program which involve developing skills for the music industry. These programs, assessed by the school's music staff, allow senior students to organise and coordinate regular weekend performance nights that showcase the talents of both current and past alumni.

Outside of classroom lessons, private instrumental classes are offered to students. These are run either before, during or after school hours.

ELTHAM College also has a competition based around music. Each year students compete in their houses for the Pitcher Trophy. Each house must develop and perform a 15-20 minute performance incorporating Acting, Dance, Choir and Instrumental. Eltham invites external adjudicators to judge the performance of the acts. The event takes place annually at Hamer Hall in the Melbourne Arts Centre. There is a singing competition that takes place each year.

Sport and physical education

Inter-school sport
The physical education program is offered to all students from Prep to Year 12, with students being able to compete in inter-school competition from Year 3, with compulsory participation from Year 5 up to and including Year 10. Years 3 to 6 play many of the same sports as the secondary students, often with slight rule and equipment modifications to cater for their ages. Most of the sporting venues are on campus including playing fields, tennis courts,  basketball courts, A hockey pitch and a Swimming Pool.

In the primary years (Years 3 to 6) Eltham College is part of the Eltham District Primary School Sports Association (EDPSSA). St. Thomas Apostle, Eltham North Primary School, Eltham Primary School, Eltham East Primary School, Research Primary School and Our Lady Help of Christians Primary School are also in the district league.

In the secondary years (Years 7 to 12) Eltham College was a founding member of the Association of Co-educational Schools but is now a member of the Eastern Independent Schools of Melbourne.

EISM Premierships 
Eltham College has won the following EISM premierships.

Combined:

 Swimming (2) - 1982, 1989

Boys:

 Cricket (3) - 2014, 2015, 2016
 Cross Country - 1986
 Hockey (5) - 2010, 2011, 2012, 2014, 2015
 Soccer - 2014
Soccer five-a-side - 2019
 Volleyball - 2018

Girls:

 Cross Country (4) - 1984, 1985, 1986, 1987
 Volleyball (4) - 2014-2015

Houses

House sport

ELTHAM has a house sports competition involving all students, which comprises athletics, swimming, cross country running and tennis.  Squads are selected following these carnivals to represent the school in the district competition, which incorporates bi weekly training sessions leading up to the carnivals.  Doncaster Little Athletics (athletics), Watermarc, Greensborough (swimming) and Cross Country and House tennis are on the school grounds.

School song
The school song, We're All Different People, was written by Graeme Wall, the first Director of Music at the College.

School journal
The Forum Magazine is the journal of ELTHAM College. It is published on an annual basis; with the first edition having been issued in 1974.

Alumni
Sport
Warwick Draper – K1 Kayak Slalom Olympian
 Jamie Whincup – V8 Supercar Champion

Media, entertainment and the arts
 Alexandra Adornetto – Children's Author
 Montana Cox – Winner of Australia's Next Top Model 2011
 Blair McDonough – Actor on Neighbours
 Em Rusciano – Comedian, singer, and radio presenter

References

External links
 Eltham College website

Private secondary schools in Melbourne
Educational institutions established in 1972
Buildings and structures in the Shire of Nillumbik
1973 establishments in Australia